Shōichi, Shoichi or Shouichi (written: , , , , , ,  or ) is a masculine Japanese given name. Notable people with the name include:

, Japanese photographer and editor
, Japanese professional wrestling announcer and executive
, Japanese professional wrestler
, Japanese actor
, Japanese Buddhist monk (also known as Enni)
, Japanese politician
Shoichi Kuwabara (born 1969), Japanese golfer
, Japanese sport wrestler
, Japanese politician
, Japanese footballer and manager
, Japanese actor
, Japanese academic and physicist
, Japanese golfer
, Japanese poet and writer
, Japanese newspaper publisher and philanthropist
, Japanese academic and writer
, Japanese volleyball player
, Japanese military officer

Fictional characters 
, a character in the light novel series Sword Art Online
, a character in the television series Kamen Rider Agito
, a character in the visual novel Tennis Ace

See also
5922 Shouichi, a main-belt asteroid

Japanese masculine given names